Giovanni Battista Costa may refer to:
 Giovanni Battista Costa (bishop) (1650–1714), Roman Catholic prelate and Bishop of Sagone
 Giovanni Battista Costa (painter, fl. c. 1670), Italian painter, active in Milan
 Giovanni Battista Costa (painter, born 1833) (1833–1893), Italian painter, active in Florence

See also 
 Giovanni Costa (disambiguation)